Layou Football CLub is a football club in Layou St Vincent and the Grenadines.
They currently play in the NLA Premier League.

History
Layou FC was founded in 2010 in New York City by natives of Layou. The club has recently become a well known force in Vincentian Football by winning the ALL Leewards Football Competition and becoming runners up in the 2012 SVGFF Inter-League Championship.

Squad

Football clubs in Saint Vincent and the Grenadines
2010 establishments in Saint Vincent and the Grenadines